The Green Pastures is a play written in 1930 by Marc Connelly adapted from Ol' Man Adam an' His Chillun (1928), a collection of stories written by Roark Bradford. The play was the winner of the Pulitzer Prize for Drama in 1930. It had the first all-black Broadway cast. The play and the film adaptation were generally well received and hailed by white drama and film critics. African-American intellectuals, cultural critics, and audiences were more critical of white author Connelly's claim to be presenting an authentic view of black religious thought.

The play portrays episodes from the Old Testament as seen through the eyes of a young African-American child in the Great Depression-era Southern United States, who interprets The Bible in terms familiar to her. Following Bradford's lead, Connelly set the biblical stories in New Orleans and in an all-black context. He diverged from Bradford's work, however, in enlarging the role of the character "De Lawd" (God), played on stage by Richard B. Harrison (1864–1935). The Green Pastures also featured numerous African-American spirituals arranged by Hall Johnson and performed by The Hall Johnson Choir. The cast also included singer Mabel Ridley.The chorus included torch singer Eva Sylvester and members of the Sylvester family as cherubs.

Adaptations

Connolly later collaborated with William Keighley in the direction of a Hollywood film adaptation of the play, which was made in 1936, starring Rex Ingram as "De Lawd". At the time the film caused some controversy. It was banned in Australia, Finland, and Hungary on the grounds that it was "blasphemous" to portray Biblical characters in this way.

The play was adapted for television, and presented twice during the days of live TV on the Hallmark Hall of Fame in 1957 and 1959. Both productions starred William Warfield as "De Lawd", in the largest dramatic acting role he ever had on television.

In the UK, a radio adaption by Roy Lockwood was produced from New York in October 1945. A UK television version was broadcast by BBC Television in the BBC Sunday-Night Theatre series on 14 September 1958, produced by Eric Fawcett and starring William Marshall as De Lawd.

References

 
 Connelly, Marc (1929). The Green Pastures, A Fable. New York: Faffar and Rinehart.
 Connelly, Marc (1968). Voices Offstage: A Book of Memoirs.  Chicago: Holt, Rinehart & Winston

External links
 
 
1946 Theatre Guild on the Air radio adaptation at Internet Archive

1930 plays
Broadway plays
Plays by Marc Connelly
Plays based on books
Pulitzer Prize for Drama-winning works
Plays about race and ethnicity
Great Depression plays
American plays adapted into films
Southern United States in fiction
Plays set in New Orleans
Works based on the Old Testament